Room Service is the second country album by The Oak Ridge Boys, released in 1978. It was their biggest hit on the US Billboard 200, where it peaked at number three. It includes the singles "Cryin' Again" and "Come On In".

Track listing

Personnel
The Oak Ridge Boys
Duane Allen - lead vocals
Joe Bonsall - tenor vocals
William Lee Golden - baritone vocals 
Richard Sterban - bass vocals
Additional musicians
James Burton, Jimmy Capps, Al Casey, Wayne Moss, Jerry Shook, Bobby Thompson, Chip Young - acoustic guitar
Bobby Thompson - banjo
Joe Osborn, Henry Strzelecki - bass guitar
Lloyd Green - Dobro
Hayward Bishop, Kenny Buttrey, Jerry Carrigan, John Guerin - drums
James Burton, Billy Sanford, Pete Wade, Reggie Young - electric guitar
Johnny Gimble, Tommy Williams - fiddle
Charlie McCoy - harmonica
David Briggs, Bobby Emmons, Randy Goodrum, John Hobbs, Ron Oates - keyboards
Johnny Gimble - mandolin
Farrell Morris - percussion
Lloyd Green, Weldon Myrick - steel guitar
Bergen White - string arrangements

The Oak Ridge Boys albums
1978 albums
ABC Records albums
Albums produced by Ron Chancey